The D.A. is an American legal drama television series that aired from March 19 until April 9, 2004.

Premise
David Franks is a politically ambitious district attorney in Los Angeles.

Cast
Steven Weber as DA David Franks
Bruno Campos as Mark Camacho
Michaela Conlin as Jinette McMahon
Ron Clarkson as The D.A.
J. K. Simmons as Joe Carter
Sarah Paulson as Lisa Patterson
Alan Angle as 'Bestie'
Bobby Cook as 'Ex-Bestie'

Episodes

References

External links
 

2004 American television series debuts
2004 American television series endings
2000s American drama television series
2000s American legal television series
English-language television shows
American Broadcasting Company original programming
Television series by Warner Bros. Television Studios
Television shows set in Los Angeles
Television series about prosecutors